One Way Home is the third studio album by American rock band the Hooters, released in 1987 by Columbia Records. The album peaked at #27 on the Billboard 200 chart on August 29, 1987.

Background
After over two years of touring throughout the world, the Hooters picked up new instruments and ideas on their travels, creating an album that was a departure from their past work.

"Johnny B" and "Satellite" both charted at #61 on the Billboard Hot 100 when released as singles.

"Karla with a K" came about from simple jamming on the road through Louisiana. The song itself was inspired by an Irish street singer the band met in New Orleans. The song was released in the UK as a single and charted at #81.

Toward the middle of the song "One Way Home," a guitar riff from the Beatles' "Taxman" can be heard.

A different version of "Fightin' on the Same Side" was originally recorded on the band's 1983 independent label album Amore.

The music for "Washington's Day" was written by Eric Bazilian and Rob Hyman when they were on tour, while producer Rick Chertoff and a longtime friend from Arista Records, Willie Nile, wrote the lyrics.

In late 1987, the Hooters experienced their first major commercial success in Europe. After heavy airplay in the United Kingdom, "Satellite" became a hit single, reaching No. 22, with the band performing on the popular British television show Top of the Pops on December 3, where they would meet one of their musical idols, Paul McCartney.

The picture for the album cover was taken on a farm on Long Island, New York.

Track listing

 "Satellite" (Rob Hyman, Eric Bazilian, Rick Chertoff) – 4:19
 "Karla with a K" (The Hooters) – 4:42
 "Johnny B" (Hyman, Bazilian, Chertoff) – 4:01
 "Graveyard Waltz" (Hyman, Bazilian, Chertoff) – 6:29
 "Fightin' on the Same Side" (Hyman, Bazilian, Chertoff) – 4:09
 "One Way Home" (Hyman, Bazilian) – 5:56
 "Washington's Day" (Hyman, Bazilian, Chertoff, Willie Nile) – 5:52
 "Hard Rockin Summer" (Hyman, Bazilian) – 3:03
 "Engine 999" (Hyman, Bazilian, Chertoff) – 4:11

Personnel
The Hooters
Eric Bazilian – lead vocals (tracks 1, 2, 6, 7, 8), guitars, bass (all tracks except 1, 6), mandolin, harmonica, saxophone
Rob Hyman – lead vocals (tracks 3, 4, 5, 8, 9), keyboards, accordion
Andy King – bass (tracks 1, 6), vocals
John Lilley – guitar
David Uosikkinen – drums
Technical
Adapted from the album liner notes.

Rick Chertoff – producer
Eric Bazilian – co-producer
Rob Hyman – co-producer
Dave Thoener – engineer, mixing
Rod O'Brien – engineer
Phil Nicolo – engineer
Frank Pekoc – assistant engineer
Joe Henehan – assistant engineer
Teddy Trewhella – assistant engineer
Rhonda Epstein – digital editing
George Marino – mastering 
Janet Perr – art direction, design 
David Katzenstein – photography

Charts

Certifications

References

1987 albums
The Hooters albums
Albums produced by Eric Bazilian
Albums produced by Rick Chertoff
Albums produced by Rob Hyman